Barzabod was a high-ranking Iranian official in 5th-century Sasanian Iran. A Mihranid prince of the Gardman region, he served as the viceroy of Caucasian Albania.

According to the Georgian chronicler Juansher, Barzabod married off her daughter Sagdukht to his Iberian neighbor, Mihrdat V, then heir apparent to King Archil of Iberia, and eventually king in his own right. The marriage helped to seal peace between the once hostile neighbors. After Archil's death c. 435, Sagdukht relied on her father for support during her regency for her underage son, Vakhtang I of Iberia.    

Barzabod died around 440, and was succeeded by his son Varaz-Bakur.

References

Sources
 
  
 
  

5th-century Iranian people
5th-century monarchs in Asia
440 deaths
Mihranids
Year of birth unknown
Zoroastrian rulers
Vassal rulers of the Sasanian Empire
Princes of Gardman
Caucasian Albania
Governors of the Sasanian Empire